Ipanema is an Old Tupi term meaning "bad water", i.e. a body of water that is unsuitable to a certain task (from y "water" + panema "barren, contaminated, unhealthy, unlucky"). It can refer to:

Places
 Ipanema, Rio de Janeiro, a neighborhood in Rio de Janeiro city, Brazil
 Ipanema, Minas Gerais, Brazil
 Ipanema, Rio Grande do Sul, a neighborhood in Porto Alegre, Brazil
 Ipanema River in Alagoas and Pernambuco, Brazil
 Conceição de Ipanema, Minas Gerais, Brazil
 Fazenda Ipanema, São Paulo, Brazil, a small settlement near Iperó and Boituva
 Royal Ironworks of St John, Ipanema, called in Portuguese Fundição Ipanema, historical ironworks at Fazenda Ipanema
 Santana do Ipanema, Alagoas, Brazil
 Ipanema Park, Minas Gerais, Brazil

Persons
 José Antônio Moreira, count of Ipanema
 José Antônio Moreira Filho, 2nd Baron of Ipanema
 "The Girl from Ipanema", Brazilian celebrity Heloísa Pinheiro who inspired the eponymous song (see below)

Popular culture
 Ipanema : a British alternative/punk-rock band active between 2002 and 2008, with lead vocalist Darren Brown
 Banda de Ipanema : a famous carnival parade in Rio de Janeiro
 Beyond Ipanema : Brazilian Waves in Global Music, a 2009 documentary movie
 Girl from Ipanema Goes to Greenland : a 1986 single by The B-52's
 "The Girl from Ipanema" (Garota de Ipanema) : a bossa nova song written in 1962
 Ipanema (album)
 Magical Chinese Girl Ipanema! : a Japanese tokusatsu program broadcast in 1989.

Other
 aircraft: Embraer EMB 202 Ipanema, an agricultural aircraft from Brazil
 bat: Ipanema Bat, the New World leaf-nosed bat species Pygoderma bilabiatum
 company: Ipanema Technologies, a French IT company
 brand: Ipanema, a Brazilian sandals brand owned by Grendene
 football club: Ipanema Atlético Clube, a Brazilian football (soccer) club
 car: Chevrolet Ipanema, the estate version of the 1989 Brazilian Chevrolet Kadett
 Ipanema (crustacean), a genus of crustaceans in the family Ipanemidae